The  is a low-floor minibus produced by Hino Motors through the J-Bus joint venture.

First generation (2002-2005) 
The first-generation Poncho was based on the Fiat Ducato chassis.
VF3ZCPMAC (2002)

Second generation (2006-present) 
The second-generation Poncho was developed from the Hino Liesse.
ADG-HX6JHAE/LAE (2006)
BDG-HX6JHAE/LAE (2007)
SDG/SKG-HX9JHBE/LBE (2011)

References

External links 

 Hino Poncho product page
 Fact sheet

Poncho
Buses of Japan
Bus chassis
Minibuses
Low-floor buses
Vehicles introduced in 2002